Ruoholahti metro station (- "Grassy Bay") is a station on the Helsinki Metro. There are 72 bicycle and 140 car parking spaces at Ruoholahti. It serves the district of Ruoholahti in central Helsinki. Ruoholahti is served by both lines M1 and M2. It was the western endpoint of the metropolitan line for over 24 years until the 1st phase of the western phase was completed and the undergrounds of Matinkylä started on 18 November 2017.

The station was opened on 16 August 1993 and was designed by Jouko Kontio and Seppo Kilpiä. Ruoholahti is located 1.2 kilometers western  of Kamppi and 2.2 kilometres eastern of Lauttasaari.

References

External links 

Helsinki Metro stations
Railway stations opened in 1993
1993 establishments in Finland
Ruoholahti